Kermit DeKoven Johnson (born February 22, 1952) is a former American football running back who played two seasons with the San Francisco 49ers of the National Football League (NFL). He was drafted by the San Francisco 49ers in the seventh round of the 1974 NFL Draft. 

Johnson attended Blair High School in his hometown of Pasadena, California. He played college football for the UCLA Bruins football team, where he was a Consensus All-American and was named to the 1973 All-Pacific-8 Conference football team.

He was also a running back for the Southern California Sun of the World Football League.

References

External links
College stats

1952 births
All-American college football players
American football running backs
Living people
Players of American football from Los Angeles
San Francisco 49ers players
Southern California Sun players
UCLA Bruins football players
Players of American football from Pasadena, California
Blair High School (Pasadena, California) alumni